Nie Weiping (born 17 August 1952) is a professional Go player.

Biography 
Born in Shenzhou, Nie began learning Go at the age of nine and won the inaugural World Amateur Go Championship in 1979. Nie was given 9 dan rank in 1982. He became famous in the Go world after leading China to victory in the China-Japan Supermatches, beating several top Japanese players including his teacher, Fujisawa Hideyuki. He earned the nickname "Steel Goalkeeper" for his ability to string together wins as the last Chinese player left. Nie won the Tianyuan twice, in 1991 and 1992. Nie authored the book Nie Weiping on Go: The Art of Positional Judgment in 1995.

Promotion record

Titles and runners-up 
 
Ranks #3 in total number of titles in China.

References

1952 births
Living people
Chinese Go players
Go (game) writers
Sportspeople from Hebei
People from Shenzhou City